N65 may refer to:

Roads 
 N65 highway (Philippines)
 N65 road (Ireland)
 Nebraska Highway 65, in the United States

Other uses 
 N65 (Long Island bus)
 Escadrille N65, a unit of the French Air Force
 , a S-class submarine of the Royal Navy sunk in 1940
 , a U-class submarine of the Royal Navy sunk in 1941
 London Buses route N65
 Nikon N65, a camera